Palaquium bourdillonii is a species of plant in the family Sapotaceae. It is native to Kerala and Tamil Nadu in India. It is threatened by habitat loss.

References

bourdillonii
Flora of Kerala
Flora of Tamil Nadu
Vulnerable plants
Taxonomy articles created by Polbot